Potamoceratodus is an extinct genus of lungfish belonging to the family Ceratodontidae known from the Late Jurassic Morrison Formation of Colorado, USA. It was first named by Jason D. Pardo, Adam K. Huttenlocker, Bryan J. Small and Mark A. Gorman II in 2010 and the type species is Potamoceratodus guentheri.

References

Late Jurassic fish
Jurassic bony fish
Prehistoric lungfish genera
Fossil taxa described in 2010
Fossils of the United States
History of Colorado